Rebecca Loos (born 19 June 1977) is a Dutch former personal assistant, glamour model, and media personality. Loos first came to public attention following her claims that she had conducted an affair with the married footballer David Beckham while she was employed as his personal assistant. The allegations led to Loos appearing on several reality television series, magazine covers, and in other media for a few years thereafter.

Early life and education
Loos was born in Madrid, Spain, but holds Dutch citizenship. Her father, Leonard Loos Bartholdi, was a Dutch diplomat, and her mother, Elizabeth Loos, is originally from Surrey, England. Loos was privately educated at Runnymede College in Madrid. She is a second cousin of Piers Morgan, who was editor of the Daily Mirror tabloid newspaper when Loos initially gained media attention.

Career
Loos became the personal assistant to former England national football team captain David Beckham, when he transferred to Real Madrid in July 2003. Her employment was terminated a few months later and Loos subsequently gave an interview to the British tabloid newspaper News of the World in April 2004, alleging that she and Beckham had conducted a four-month affair whilst he was married to his wife Victoria. The claims were never corroborated and were dismissed by Beckham as "ludicrous", although he did not mount a legal challenge to the story.

Shortly after the newspaper coverage of her alleged affair with Beckham, Loos commenced a career as a media personality. In 2004, she briefly appeared as a hostess on the Dutch TV programme Shownieuws.

In October 2004, Loos made a controversial appearance on the reality television programme The Farm, a Channel 5 version of the Raidió Teilifís Éireann show Celebrity Farm. The Royal Society for the Prevention of Cruelty to Animals accused producers of pandering to a "morbid and sordid fascination with farm animals", while People for the Ethical Treatment of Animals and Mediawatch-uk demanded the show be taken off the air.

In 2005, Loos appeared on the ITV network reality television show Celebrity Love Island. The same year, Loos took part in a staged wedding ceremony with American fashion model Jenny Shimizu for the television programme Power Lesbian UK to protest against America's laws on same-sex marriage. It was broadcast in the United States as Power Lesbians on Logo TV. The two had a relationship for a period thereafter. Loos has stated that she is bisexual and "has been ever since [she] was a teenager."

Loos played for the England Women's football team in a Sky TV charity event in 2006. In April that same year, she also ran the London Marathon, and raised more than £7,000 in sponsorship for the British Red Cross. Later, in May, Loos appeared on The X Factor: Battle of the Stars alongside James Hewitt, in which she famously received a negative reception from judge Sharon Osbourne.

Loos was a contestant on the Spanish version of Survivor in 2007, in which she came third. In November of that year, she appeared in Sky TV's Cirque de Celebrite in which she was one of two new contestants introduced midway through the series.

In 2008, Loos was a guest on The Podge and Rodge Show. In September, she had a part in a Dutch feature film called Mijn vader is een Detective. In October, she took part in the Dutch version of 71 Degrees North (71 Graden Noord).

Loos has been featured on the covers of Playboy, FHM, Nuts, Zoo Weekly and other men's magazines and lad mags.

Personal life
Loos met her future husband, Norwegian doctor Sven Christjar Skaiaa, while she was filming 71 Graden Noord. After becoming pregnant, she relocated to Norway in 2009, and has only made occasional media appearances since then. Loos has stated on her official website that she is now a mother of two sons, and works as a yoga teacher.

Notable media appearances
 2004 – Hostess on Dutch television show Shownieuws
 October 2004 – Participant on The Farm
 2004 – Extreme Celebrity Detox for Channel 4
 February–April 2005 (on screen) – Dream Team, a Sky football-based TV series. Recurring role of Naomi Wyatt, a sports psychologist
 Summer, 2005 – Participant on the ITV reality show Celebrity Love Island
 Autumn, 2005 – Hostess of the TV documentary Power Lesbian UK for Logo TV
 January 2006 – Celebrity model in the Dutch edition of Playboy magazine
 April 2006 – Participant in the Belgian/Dutch version of the reality show Temptation Island
 April 2006 – England team member in Sky1's Celebrity World Cup Soccer Tournament (losing 2–1 to Brazil in the final).
 May 2006 – Contestant in The X Factor: Battle of the Stars celebrity show, singing along with James Hewitt
 February 2007 – Appeared on New Zealand's reality TV show Treasure Island: Pirates of the Pacific
 May 2007 – Contestant on the Spanish version of Survivor, in which she came third
 November 2007 – Contestant on Sky TV's Cirque de Celebrite. Loos was voted out by the public after just a week.
 8–9 December 2008 – Guest host of television's The Podge and Rodge Show

References

External links

1977 births
Living people
Bisexual models
Bisexual women
English people of Dutch descent
Glamour models
Dutch LGBT entertainers
Dutch LGBT rights activists
People from Madrid
Dutch people of English descent
The X Factor (British TV series) contestants
Dutch LGBT broadcasters
English expatriates in Spain
Dutch expatriates in Spain